Joanna Zachoszcz (born 17 April 1993) is a Polish swimmer. She competed in the women's marathon 10 kilometre event at the 2016 Summer Olympics.

References

External links
 

1993 births
Living people
Polish female long-distance swimmers
Olympic swimmers of Poland
Swimmers at the 2016 Summer Olympics
People from Połczyn-Zdrój